Dwight G. Nishimura is the Addie and Al Macovski professor in the School of Engineering, and professor of Electrical Engineering at Stanford University. 
He leads the Magnetic Resonance Systems Research Laboratory (MRSRL), which designs improved MRI techniques and equipment.

Education and Career
Nishimura received his MS and BS in 1980 and a PhD in 1984 from Stanford University. All three degrees were in electrical engineering.

He develops new acquisition and processing techniques for improved medical imaging.

Nishimura holds approximately 25 patents as of July 2019.

Awards and honors
 Gold Medal of the International Society of Magnetic Resonance in Medicine (ISMRM) (2018)
IEEE Senior Member (2014)
F. E. Terman Engineering Scholastic Award (1979). First cohort to receive this scholastic achievement award in the School of Engineering.
Fellow of the American Institute for Medical and Biological Engineering (2004)

References

External links 
U.S. National Library of Medicine, National Center for Biotechnology Information, Dwight Nishimura’s Bibliography

American electrical engineers
Stanford University Department of Electrical Engineering faculty
Living people
Stanford University School of Engineering faculty
Stanford University alumni
Year of birth missing (living people)
Fellows of the American Institute for Medical and Biological Engineering
American biomedical engineers